The Copa del Rey de Hockey Hierba is the second most important competition of field hockey in Spain. It was founded in 1914 and is managed by the Real Federación Española de Hockey.

Champion by year

Titles by team

See also
Copa de la Reina de Hockey Hierba
División de Honor de Hockey Hierba

External links
 Real Federación Española de Hockey

 
Field hockey competitions in Spain
Recurring sporting events established in 1914
1914 establishments in Spain
Spain